The Sebeș is a right tributary of the river Timiș in Romania. It discharges into the Timiș in Caransebeș. The name of the river originates from the Hungarian adjective sebes meaning "speedy".

References

Rivers of Romania
Rivers of Caraș-Severin County